Norene E. Forbes (July 24, 1914 – June 15, 2004), later known by her married name Norene Lancucki, was an American competition swimmer who represented the United States at the 1932 Summer Olympics in Los Angeles.  Forbes finished sixth overall in the 400-meter freestyle, recording a time of 6:06.0 in the event final.

References

1914 births
2004 deaths
American female freestyle swimmers
Olympic swimmers of the United States
Swimmers from Los Angeles
Swimmers at the 1932 Summer Olympics
20th-century American women
21st-century American women